Adrianus Taroreh (3 August 1966 – 5 February 2013) was an Indonesian boxer. He competed in the men's lightweight event at the 1988 Summer Olympics.

References

1966 births
2013 deaths
Indonesian male boxers
Olympic boxers of Indonesia
Boxers at the 1988 Summer Olympics
People from Manado
Asian Games medalists in boxing
Boxers at the 1986 Asian Games
Asian Games silver medalists for Indonesia
Medalists at the 1986 Asian Games
Southeast Asian Games medalists in boxing
Lightweight boxers
20th-century Indonesian people